Utbremen Radio Tower, also known as Utbremen Transmission Tower or Utbremen Broadcast Tower, ( "Utbremen Radio Tower") was a wooden German lattice radio tower that was mainly built for mediumwave broadcasting. The tower was built in 1933 but was destroyed six years later, in 1939, by lightning. It had an antenna that was 90 metres long.

History

The Utbremen Radio Tower was built in the city of Bremen, in the year 1933. It was then destroyed, six years after the tower was built, by lightning.

Geography

The Utbremen Radio Tower was located in the Hanseatic city municipality of Bremen, which is the capital city of the free Hanseatic state of Bremen, the smallest of Germany's 16 states.

See also

Lattice tower
Gustav-Vietor-Tower
Gross Reken Melchenberg Radio Tower
Gillerberg Observation Tower
Schomberg Observation Tower
Bremen

References

External links
SkyscraperPage Forum

Towers completed in 1933
Former towers
Communication towers in Germany
Buildings and structures demolished in 1939
1933 establishments in Germany
1939 disestablishments in Germany
Buildings and structures in Bremen (city)